Mathieu Gomes Garcez (born 6 March 1985 in Bayonne) is a French footballer.

Gomes started his career as a forward but is now a right back. He played in Spain and Italy before moving to Greece in 2012.

References

External links

Ματιέ Γκομές at PAE Kerkyra 

Living people
1985 births
Sportspeople from Bayonne
French-Basque people
French footballers
French expatriate footballers
Real Sociedad B footballers
UD Salamanca players
Real Unión footballers
F.C. Aprilia Racing Club players
Segunda División B players
Expatriate footballers in Greece
Expatriate footballers in Italy
Expatriate footballers in Spain
French expatriate sportspeople in Spain
French expatriate sportspeople in Greece
French expatriate sportspeople in Italy
PAE Kerkyra players
Super League Greece players
Association football forwards
Association football fullbacks
Footballers from Nouvelle-Aquitaine